Téa Leoni (born Elizabeth Téa Pantaleoni; February 25, 1966) is an American actress. In her early career, she starred in the television sitcoms Flying Blind (1992–93) and The Naked Truth (1995–98). Her breakthrough role was in the 1995 action comedy film Bad Boys. In later years, Leoni had lead roles in films such as Deep Impact (1998), The Family Man (2000), Jurassic Park III (2001), Spanglish (2004), and Fun with Dick and Jane (2005). From 2014 to 2019, she starred as Elizabeth McCord in the CBS political drama series Madam Secretary.

Early life and family
Leoni was born on February 25, 1966, in New York City. Her mother, Emily Ann (née Patterson), was a dietitian and nutritionist, and her father, Anthony Pantaleoni, was a corporate lawyer with the firm Fulbright & Jaworski. Her paternal grandfather was of Italian, English, and Irish descent; he was a nephew of Italian economist and politician Maffeo Pantaleoni. Leoni's paternal grandmother, American silent film actress and humanitarian Helenka Adamowska Pantaleoni, was born in Brookline, Massachusetts to Polish musicians Józef Adamowski and Antonina Szumowska-Adamowska. Leoni's mother is a native of Amarillo, Texas, and a niece of actor Hank Patterson.

Leoni grew up in Englewood, New Jersey, and New York City, and attended two private schools, Brearley School and The Putney School in Vermont. She attended but did not complete studies at Sarah Lawrence College.

In a 2017 episode of Finding Your Roots, hosted by Henry Louis Gates Jr., Leoni discovered that her mother Emily, who was adopted, is the biological daughter of Mavis Abilene Gindratt from Vick, Louisiana, and Sumpter James Daniel, whose ancestors originated in Ireland, settled in Virginia in the early 18th century, and had a plantation in Fairfax County, seven miles from George Washington. Her mother's adoptive parents were Florry Elizabeth (née Roberts) and Virgil Pearson Patterson.

Career
In 1988, Leoni was cast as one of the stars of Angels 88, an updated version of the 1970s show Charlie's Angels. After production delays, the show never aired. The following year, she was cast as Lisa DiNapoli in the NBC daytime soap opera Santa Barbara. In 1991, she made her film debut with a small role in the comedy Switch and later played another small part in A League of Their Own (1992).

From 1992 to 1993, Leoni starred with Corey Parker in the short-lived Fox sitcom Flying Blind.  In February 1995, she appeared in the sitcom Frasier, a spinoff from Cheers, as the fiancée of Sam Malone (played by Ted Danson). Later in that year, she landed the lead role in the ABC/NBC sitcom The Naked Truth, playing Nora Wilde, a tabloid news journalist. The show ran through 1998. She was also offered to play the role of Rachel Green on the hit sitcom Friends which she then turned down to star in The Naked Truth. Leoni had the female lead role in the 1995 action comedy film Bad Boys, which was a box office success, grossing over $141 million worldwide.

After leaving television, Leoni had a leading role in Deep Impact (1998), a big-budget disaster film about a comet hurtling towards Earth. The film received mixed reviews from critics but was a success at the box office, grossing $349 million worldwide. She later had main roles in two other big budget movies: romantic comedy The Family Man (2000), co-starring alongside Nicolas Cage, and science fiction film Jurassic Park III (2001) as William H. Macy's character's ex-wife. In 2002, she starred as a film studio executive in Hollywood Ending, directed by Woody Allen and had a supporting role in the box office bomb crime drama People I Know. In 2004, she appeared as the wife of Adam Sandler's character in the financially unsuccessful comedy-drama Spanglish. In 2005, Leoni starred alongside Jim Carrey in the comedy film Fun with Dick and Jane. The movie grossed $202 million at the box office worldwide.

Leoni co-starred in a number of small films in the late 2000s, including You Kill Me and The Smell of Success. She co-starred opposite Ricky Gervais in the 2008 supernatural comedy-drama Ghost Town. In 2011, she had a supporting role in the heist comedy film, Tower Heist. In 2011, she was also cast alongside Hope Davis as leads in the HBO comedy pilot, Spring/Fall; however, the pilot was not picked up. Leoni starred as Elizabeth McCord in the CBS political drama Madam Secretary, which ran from September 21, 2014, to December 8, 2019.

Personal life
Leoni married Neil Joseph Tardio, Jr., a television commercial producer, on June 8, 1991, at St. Luke's Episcopal Church in Hope, New Jersey. They divorced in 1995.

Leoni married actor David Duchovny on May 13, 1997, after an eight-week courtship. They have two children, daughter Madelaine West Duchovny and son Kyd Miller Duchovny. In 2008, Leoni and Duchovny separated; Duchovny received treatment for sex addiction from August to October. The couple reconciled in 2009 but separated again in June 2011. Duchovny filed for divorce in June 2014, and the couple had agreed to settlement terms by that August. After splitting from Duchovny, Leoni moved to Riverside Drive on the Upper West Side of New York City.

Leoni began dating her Madam Secretary co-star Tim Daly, another alumnus of The Putney School, in December 2014.

Humanitarian work
Leoni was named a UNICEF goodwill ambassador in 2001. Helenka Pantaleoni, her paternal grandmother, was the president of the U.S. Fund for UNICEF for more than 25 years.

Asteroid
Asteroid 8299 Téaleoni, discovered by Eric Elst at La Silla in 1993, was named after Leoni.

Filmography

Film

Television

Awards and nominations

References

External links

1966 births
20th-century American actresses
21st-century American actresses
Actresses from New York City
American film actresses
American people of English descent
American people of Irish descent
American people of Italian descent
American people of Polish descent
American soap opera actresses
American television actresses
Living people
People from Englewood, New Jersey
People from the Upper East Side
Sarah Lawrence College alumni
UNICEF Goodwill Ambassadors
The Putney School alumni
Brearley School alumni
People from the Upper West Side